Browns Creek Bike Path is a Class I bike path that is “tucked away from the surrounding hustle and bustle” of the San Fernando Valley, “hugging the side” of the Browns Canyon Wash.

The path begins at Lassen Street, just east of Chatsworth Metrolink Station, and ends just north of Rinaldi Street near Stoney Point Park.

Browns Creek (sometimes called Brown’s Creek), a tributary of the Los Angeles River, offers “splendid views of the irregularly shaped Santa Susana mountains rising to the west.” One local writer observed, “What [the concrete-lined creek] lacks in scenery, it compensates for by providing the trail with an open, airy setting.”

The route has been described as “very rustic” (for an urban bike path, of course). The wash passes through a neighborhood with equestrian zoning and “Opposite the bike route, in the west levee, a horse trail also follows the creek.” Domestic goats, roosters and ponies have also been seen along the path.

At Chatsworth station, bicyclists may connect to the Orange Line Bike Path.

The path is in close proximity to Chatsworth Park North and Chatsworth Park South (both operated by the City of Los Angeles Parks Department) and Chatsworth Nature Preserve.

Both Chatsworth Parks, “excellent parks…[with] interesting hills and rock formations there, as well as pleasant shaded rest areas” are accessible from Valley Circle Road. Riders can create an approximately  loop beginning at either end of the Browns Creek route, connecting to Valley Circle Road via either Chatsworth Street or Lassen Street.

See also
 List of Los Angeles bike paths
 G Line (Los Angeles Metro)

References

External links
 laparks.org: Brown’s Creek Trail Map
 labikepaths.com: Brown Creek - info from 2010-2020
 Bike Travel in the SFV - Chatsworth
 Los Angeles Bikeway Map (Metro.net) - HTML
  Los Angeles Bikeway Map (Metro.net) - PDF hosted on Dropbox
 "Metro Bike Map" Map of many Class I, II, and III bikeways in Los Angeles County (876kB PDF, April 2006)

Bike paths in Los Angeles
Transportation in the San Fernando Valley
Parks in the San Fernando Valley